Qapanvari (also Romanized as Qapānvarī and Qapānwari) is a village in Darreh Seydi Rural District, in the Central District of Borujerd County, Lorestan Province, Iran. At the 2006 census, its population was 266, spread among 67 families.

References 

Towns and villages in Borujerd County